The Continental NYC, originally known as Tower 111, is a 53-story, 338-unit luxury rental skyscraper designed by architect Costas Kondylis in the New York City borough of Manhattan at 885 Sixth Avenue and 32nd Street in Midtown Manhattan. Its exclusive representative is the Atlantic Development Group.

References
Notes

External links

Residential skyscrapers in Manhattan
Residential buildings completed in 2011
Residential condominiums in New York City
Midtown Manhattan